Thomas Brophy was an English professional association footballer who played as a full back for a number of Football League clubs in the 1920s.

References

Aberdare Athletic F.C. players
Association football defenders
Burnley F.C. players
English Football League players
English footballers
Footballers from St Helens, Merseyside
Southend United F.C. players
St Helens Town A.F.C. players
Year of birth missing
Year of death missing